Without Warning may refer to:

Film and television 
 Without Warning, alternate title selected by contest for The Story Without a Name (1924)
 Without Warning!, a 1952 film noir
 Without Warning (1980 film), a film starring Jack Palance
 Without Warning (1994 film), a made-for-television science fiction film
 Without Warning, a 1999 made-for-television film starring Arkie Whiteley
 Without Warning, a 2002 film starring Elizabeth Rodriguez
 Best of the Best 4: Without Warning, a 1998 direct-to-video martial arts film
 Without Warning: The James Brady Story, a 1991 made-for-television film written by Robert Bolt
 Diagnosis Murder: Without Warning, a made-for-television film based on the TV series Diagnosis: Murder

Music 
 Without Warning (band), an American progressive metal band 1988–1998
 Without Warning (album), by 21 Savage, Offset, and Metro Boomin, 2017
Without Warning, a 1985 album by Everyman Band
 Without Warning, a 2008 album by Thomas Ian Nicholas
 Without Warning, a 1991 album by Blaq Poet and DJ Hot Day, recording as PHD
 "Without Warning", a song by The Soundtrack of Our Lives from Communion
 "Without Warning", a song by Thine Eyes Bleed from In the Wake of Separation

Other media 
 Without Warning (Birmingham novel), a 2008 alternative history novel by John Birmingham
 Without Warning, a 2014 mystery novel by David Rosenfelt
 Without Warning (video game), a 2005 third-person shooter

See also 
 No Warning (disambiguation)